Jugraj Singh (born 1950) is an Indian athlete. He competed in the men's shot put at the 1972 Summer Olympics.

References

1950 births
Living people
Athletes (track and field) at the 1972 Summer Olympics
Indian male shot putters
Olympic athletes of India
Place of birth missing (living people)
Athletes (track and field) at the 1974 Asian Games
Medalists at the 1974 Asian Games
Asian Games bronze medalists for India
Asian Games medalists in athletics (track and field)